''The Stage Awards''' are theatre awards created by The Stage to recognise and celebrate theatrical achievements across the UK and internationally. Established in 2011, the awards recognise accomplishments by West End theatres, regional theatre, fringe theatres, producers, drama schools and more. The awards ceremony is held annually on the final Friday of January at the Theatre Royal Drury Lane, London. In 2020, the awards relocated to a new venue, the Royal Opera House.

In 2021, whilst there was no shortlist or physical ceremony, the awards were re-imagined to celebrate individuals and performing arts organisations that went above and beyond during the coronavirus pandemic to keep theatre alive. Winners include Theatre Support Fund +, which was awarded the Innovation Award for its extraordinary fundraising achievements for theatre workers and the NHS.

For 2022, The Stage Awards returned to Theatre Royal Drury Lane, its former home of nine years, and took place in the auditorium for the first time following its multi-million pound renovation.  

Notable winners include Sonia Friedman, who won the Producer of the Year award three times in a row between 2015 and 2017, and Sheffield Theatres which has won Regional Theatre of the Year four times in 2013, 2014, 2017 and 2020.

Originally known as The Stage 100 Awards, the ceremony was held at The Stages New Year Party and set out to recognise parts of the theatre industry which weren't recognised at other awards.

Judging Process 
Any performing arts organisation, regardless of size, is able to be nominated for The Stage Awards. An open nominations process allows any individual to nominate themselves or another organisation they admire. After nominations are submitted by the public, the judging panel consult 50 leading figures within the UK theatre industry, working across all sectors, and ask for their input for the long list. At this point, senior figures within The Stage's editorial team are also consulted. Finally, a judging panel meet to consider all submissions, choosing the shortlist and winners.

The judging panel has included The Stage's current editor Alistair Smith, previous editor Brian Attwood, associate editor Mark Shenton, associate editor Lyn Gardner, theatre critic Aleks Sierz, theatre critic Susan Elkin, news editor Matt Hemley, reviews editor Natasha Tripney, critic Tim Bano, features editor Nick Clark, former Theatrical Management Association president AK Bennett Hunter, reporter Natalie Woolman.

As of 2021, the current judging panel comprises: The Stage's current editor Alistair Smith, Daily Mail entertainment columnist Baz Bamigboye, Get Into Theatre director Ahmet Ahmet, critic for The Guardian Arifa Akbar, columnist for The Stage and critic for Variety David Benedict, features editor of The Stage Nick Clark, associate editor for The Stage Lyn Gardner, news editor of The Stage Matt Hemley, chief reporter of The Stage Georgia Snow and reviews editor of The Stage Natasha Tripney.

Awards Categories 
When first established, the only categories were Regional Theatre of the Year, London Theatre of the Year, Fringe Theatre of the Year, Producer of the Year and School of the Year.

The Unsung Hero Award was added in 2012, to recognise individuals who had made a key contribution to the theatre industry out of the limelight. In its first year, the award was presented to 3 individuals: Edwin Shaw, Heather Miller and Frances Coyle.

Two new categories were added for 2015: Theatre Building of the Year and the International Award. The Theatre Building of the Year award can be given to any physical structure of space hosting theatrical performances. The International Award was set up to recognise achievements with an international element, including touring abroad or working in collaboration.

For 2017, two further categories were introduced: the Innovation Award and the Sustainability Award. The first category aims to recognise new design, technical or creative developments in the sector, and the latter category celebrates environmental initiatives undertaken by performing arts organisations.

For 2020, the Achievement in Technical Theatre award was introduced to celebrate excellence in technical theatre, recognising the superb work that has been going on behind the scenes in theatres and performance spaces all over the country.

As the industry emerges from the coronavirus pandemic, The Stage has adapted its award categories this year to reflect the way British theatre is responding to a changing world. This includes introducing two new categories - Digital Project of the Year and Community Project of the Year - and removing what seemed like an unnecessary distinction between work taking place in London and elsewhere in the UK to create a Theatre of the Year award.  

2022 categories at The Stage Awards:
 Theatre of the Year
 Fringe Theatre of the Year
 Theatre Building of the Year
 Producer of the Year
 Innovation Award
 Digital Project of the Year
 Community Project of the Year
 Unsung Hero

The Unsung Hero Award 
First introduced in 2012, the award is presented to individuals who have made an outstanding contribution to the performing arts industry. Edwin Shaw, Heather Miller and Frances Coyle were the inaugural winners of the award.

Edwin Shaw worked in the West End for more than 50 years, and served as box office manager at the London Palladium for over 35 years. Nominated by producers David Pugh and Dafydd Rogers, they said: "not a day goes by" when producers from across Theatreland do not consult Shaw. Heather Miller won for her work as a chaperone on numerous productions in the West End and on tour including Oliver!, Mary Poppins and Chitty Chitty Bang Bang. She was nominated by casting director Jo Hawes, who worked with Miller for over 17 years. Frances Coyle was presented with the award for her work at Glasgow's Citizens Theatre, where she worked for over 40 years having joined the venue in 1967.

In 2013, the Unsung Hero award was given to Anne McNulty and Chris Isherman. Anne McNulty was awarded for her 20-year career at the Donmar Warehouse as its casting director. Nominated by artistic director Josie Rourke, she was praised for unearthing talent including Tom Hiddleston and Lara Pulver. Chris Isherman was presented with the Unsung Hero award for his long standing service as the theatre manager of the Duchess Theatre, London. Nominated by producer James Seabright, he was described as "one of the last of the ‘old school’ theatre managers” that still sported a dinner jacket and greeted every audience member with care and attention before every production."

Theatre consultant Andy Collier was presented with the Unsung Hero award posthumously in 2014. The award was collected by his son Ben Collier.

The 2015 award was presented to Sue Nightingale, Birmingham Repertory Theatre's head of wardrobe for her extensive career and commitment to theatre outside of the limelight.

Stage manager Roger Miller was named Unsung Hero at The Stage Awards 2016. He won the award for his work towards saving the Felixstowe Spa Pavilion Theatre.

Ned Seago won the Unsung Hero award at The Stage Awards 2017. Seago has worked at the Old Vic, London for over 30 years with artistic director Matthew Warchus calling him "unfailingly sensitive, kind, discrete, loyal and supportive".

At The Stage Awards 2018, the award was presented to interior designer Clare Ferraby. Ferraby is behind the interiors of more than 80 theatres including the London Palladium and Theatre Royal, Nottingham, as well as the refurbished Victoria Palace, home of Hamilton.

Pat Nelder, capital development associate at Theatre Clwyd since 1977, was awarded the Unsung Hero in 2019. He joined the theatre as a junior member in the LX department, but has since worked in various roles and is now the capital development associate. The theatre's artistic director Tamara Harvey said: "Quietly, constantly and with unceasing humility, he is the very best of us."

In 2020, front of house assistant Mary Joseph at the Almeida Theatre was awarded with the Unsung Hero award. While she started working at the Almeida as a cleaner in 1995, Joseph now works six days a week - mainly in the box office kiosk. Having worked at the north London theatre for a quarter of a century, Joseph is the “essence of the Almeida” according to its artistic director Rupert Goold.

At The Stage Awards 2022, the award was presented to understudies and covers. Collecting the award on behalf of their colleagues across the UK were four understudies and a swing: Claire Darcy (understudy on Cinderella at Eden Court, Inverness), Natasha Leaver (understudy on Hamilton at the Victoria Palace Theatre, London), Sam Lupton (understudy on the Bedknobs and Broomsticks UK Tour), Ben McDaid (understudy on Sleeping Beauty at the Millennium Forum, Derry), and Harveen Mann (Swing on the School of Rock UK Tour).

Previous Winners

The Stage Awards 2011

The Stage Awards 2012

The Stage Awards 2013

The Stage Awards 2014

The Stage Awards 2015

The Stage Awards 2016

The Stage Awards 2017

The Stage Awards 2018

The Stage Awards 2019

The Stage Awards 2020

The Stage Awards 2021

The Stage Awards 2022 
Hosted by Shan Ako and Sam Tutty.

The Stage Awards 2023 
Hosted by the cast of For Black Boys Who Have Considered Suicide When the Hue Gets too Heavy - Mark Akintimehin, Emmanuel Akwafo, Nnabiko Ejimofor, Darragh Hand, Aruna Jalloh and Kaine Lawrence.

See also 
 The Stage
 The Stage Debut Awards
 The Stage Awards for Acting Excellence

References 

British theatre awards
Awards established in 2011
2011 establishments in the United Kingdom